Sethupathy Government Arts College, is a general degree college located in Ramanathapuram, Tamil Nadu, India. It was established in the year 1965. The college is affiliated with Alagappa University and offers different courses in arts, commerce and science.

Accreditation
The college is  recognized by the University Grants Commission (UGC).

References

Educational institutions established in 1965
1965 establishments in Madras State
Colleges affiliated to Alagappa University